Idzikowice may refer to the following places:
Idzikowice, Opoczno County in Łódź Voivodeship (central Poland)
Idzikowice, Poddębice County in Łódź Voivodeship (central Poland)
Idzikowice, Masovian Voivodeship (east-central Poland)
Idzikowice, Opole Voivodeship (south-west Poland)